The Global Forum on Transparency and Exchange of Information for Tax Purposes was founded in 2000 and restructured in September 2009. It consists of OECD member countries as well as other jurisdictions that have agreed to implement tax related transparency and information exchange. The forum works under the auspices of the OECD and G20. Its mission is to "implement the international standard through two phases of peer review process". It addresses tax evasion, tax havens, offshore financial centres, tax information exchange agreements, double taxation and money laundering.

In 2000, the Forum published a blacklist of 35 tax havens, which by 2009 had shrunk to zero. It has since focused on increasing the standard for exchange of information. , the Forum had 163 member tax jurisdictions and the European Union, all on equal footing.

Activities
The Forum promotes the implementation of two internationally agreed standards on exchange of information for tax purposes: the standard on Exchange of Information on Request (EOIR) and the standard on Automatic Exchange of Information (AEOI).  Members commit to at least implement EOIR.

Exchange of Information on Request
The Forum ensures compliance with EOIR through an intense peer review process, the forum's main activity since 2009, which is carried out by its Peer Review Group composed of 30 members representative of the diversity of the Forum, and is currently chaired by Singapore.

The review focuses on three main parts, divided into ten elements: Ownership and identity information (A.1); Accounting records (A.2); Banking Information (A.3); Access to Information (B.1); Compatibility of Rights and Safeguards (B.2); Effective mechanisms for EOIR (C.1); Network of EOIR partners (C.2); Confidentiality (C.3); Respect of Rights and Safeguards (C.4); Quality and Timeliness (C.5). Every element is evaluated with regards to the legal and regulatory framework (Phase 1) but also its effective implementation (Phase 2). The output of the peer review is a report in which a rating (Compliant; Largely Compliant; Partially Compliant; Non-compliant) is attributed to each element, alongside an overall rating. The draft report is discussed and approved by the Peer Review Group, and adopted by all Forum members. Where areas of weakness are identified during the review, reports include recommendations setting out improvements jurisdictions need to make in order to reach the international standard. The peer review reports are published and made publicly available.

A first round of reviews was conducted for all member jurisdictions and jurisdictions relevant to the work of the Forum, and ended in 2016. Then, the 2010 Terms of Reference used to conduct the reviews were strengthened to integrate new principles, such as the availability of beneficial ownership information, and became the 2016 Terms of Reference. The Forum is currently in the middle of its second round of reviews.

Since 2009 it has classified tax havens into a "blacklist" of non-committers and a "graylist" (or "greylist") of non-implementers of the request-based "internationally agreed tax standard". The terms blacklist and graylist are not used by the Forum but by news services like Reuters, the BBC and the Congressional Research Service.

Automatic Exchange of Information

In 2014, the Global Forum adopted the Standard for Automatic Exchange of Financial Account Information in Tax Matters (the AEOI Standard), developed by the OECD working with G20 countries. The AEOI Standard requires financial institutions to automatically disclose information on financial accounts they maintain for non-residents to their tax authorities under the globally-agreed Common Reporting Standard (CRS), who in turn exchange this information with the tax authorities of the account holders’ country of residence.

To be able to exchange information under the AEOI Standard, jurisdictions are asked to:

 Introduce domestic rules requiring their financial institutions to collect and report the data to be exchanges
 Put in place international agreements with each if their partners to deliver the widespread networks necessary for automatic exchange
 Put in place the technical solutions to link into the Common Transmission System (CTS) that was put in place by the OECD’s Forum on Tax Administration and managed by the Global Forum

To deliver a level playing field, the Global Forum launched a commitment process under which 100 jurisdictions committed to implement the AEOI Standard and exchanges commenced accordingly in 2017. In 2018, a total of 93 jurisdictions exchanged information under the AEOI Standard. For 2019, a total of 102 jurisdictions are committed to undertake exchanges under the AEOI Standard.

Budget
The 2009 estimate of a budget was 2.9 million. It was raised by a flat fee of 15000 euros for each of the members plus a fee based on the overall GNP with an abatement of 450 USD/inhabitant.

History

Precursors
In April 1998 an OECD report acknowledged that tax havens erode the tax base of other countries and undermine the fairness of tax systems, diminishing global welfare. It noted that tax havens were expanding at an exponential rate. The report focused on tax havens in the Caribbean who were not OECD members, and the OECD was thus criticized for not addressing tax havens who were its members. A second report in 2000 included a blacklist of 35 secrecy jurisdictions - all outside the OECD - and a threat of defensive measures against them, with backing from the United States under the Clinton administration.

Creation (2000) and first years
In 2000, the Global Forum was created with 32 members. Efforts to move against tax evasion in tax havens were quickly "bogged down in arcane haggling", including by a working group between tax havens and the OECD set up at the suggestion of the Commonwealth. In the United States, the Heritage Foundation criticized the move as a European effort to limit competition among tax jurisdictions. The new U.S. administration of George Bush and his first treasury secretary Paul O'Neill stated in May 2001 that the OECD's efforts were "not in line with the administration's priorities". The OECD gave in and announced it had no intention to pursue "defensive measures" against tax havens.

After the September 11, 2001, attacks the United States wanted better cooperation from tax havens on terrorist financing, but was reluctant to tackle tax evasion forcefully. Since the two practices are very similar, the United States only asked the OECD to require tax havens to provide information on request under very narrow conditions, which became the OECD's model for information on tax exchange. As a result, for example Jersey, an important tax haven, provided information to the United States in only five or six cases over a period of seven years.

Stepping-up of efforts after the financial crisis of 2007-08

The activities against tax havens were only expanded after the financial crisis of 2007-08. At the April 2009 G-20 London summit tax havens were divided into a "blacklist" of non-committers and  a "graylist" of non-implementers, based on compliance with the request-based "internationally agreed tax standard". The actual list included three categories:

40 countries and territories substantially implemented the standard
38 countries and territories committed to but had not yet substantially implemented the standard 
 4 countries  had not committed to the standard.

The list of non-implementers initially included, among others, Austria, Belgium, Luxembourg and Switzerland. The list of non-committed included Costa Rica, Malaysia, the Philippines and Uruguay. Within five days Costa Rica, Malaysia, the Philippines and Uruguay made "a full commitment to exchange information to the OECD standards" and were removed from the "blacklist" which was thus empty. 
Panama was ‘white listed’ because it signed a tax information exchange agreement (TIEA) with France.
The British Virgin Islands and the Cayman Islands were white listed by August 2009.
No G-20 country was on the greylist of non-implementers, prompting Luxembourg Prime Minister Jean-Claude Juncker to criticise it for failing to include various states of the USA which provide incorporation infrastructure indistinguishable from the tax havens on the G-20 blacklist. Der Spiegel called the list "The World's Shortest Blacklist" and "the Fight against Tax Havens Is a Sham".

At a meeting in Mexico in September 2009, the Global Forum was restructured and received its own Secretariat. The main decisions were:
Agree on restructuring the OECD Global Forum to expand its membership and ensure its members participate on an equal footing;
Agree on how to establish an in-depth peer review process to monitor and review progress made towards full and effective exchange of information; and
Identify mechanisms to speed-up the negotiation and conclusion of agreements to exchange information and to enable developing countries to benefit from the new more cooperative tax environment.

Expansion of exchange of information
In March 2010, international efforts were stepped up when the U.S. Congress passed the Foreign Account Tax Compliance Act (FATCA) which forces foreign financial firms to disclose their American clients. Also in 2010, the 1988 Convention on Mutual Administrative Assistance in Tax Matters was amended to include automated exchange of tax information, a key instrument in fighting tax evasion, and expanding it to developing countries. In 2013, a working group was formed to promote the automated exchange of tax information.

In July 2014, the Forum published standards for Automatic Exchange of Financial Account Information.

As of November 2015, more than 90 members have committed to go beyond Exchange of Information on Request and to implement Automatic Exchange of Information. An international framework agreement, the Common Reporting Standard Multilateral Competent Authority Agreement (CRS MCAA), specifies the details of what information will be exchanged and when. As of October 2015, it has been signed by 74 jurisdictions. Since the agreement is a framework agreement, it only comes into effect for each signatory after it has confirmed that it has undertaken certain steps such as passing national legislation. According to the Forum, "Work is currently underway to implement this Standard, with the first exchanges occurring on a very ambitious timeline of 2017 and 2018".

Members and observers

Members
At its founding in 2000, the Forum had 32 member tax jurisdictions, and it had 90 members in September 2009. In November 2015, the Forum had 128 member tax jurisdictions and the European Union, and in November 2019 it had 158 members:

Tax jurisdictions

Observers
As of November 2019 there are 19 observers 

African Development Bank
African Tax Administration Forum (ATAF)
African Union Commission (AUC)
Asian Development Bank
Caribbean Community (CARICOM)	
Centre de Rencontre des Administrations Fiscales (CREDAF)
Commonwealth Secretariat
Council of Europe Development Bank
European Bank for Reconstruction and Development
European Investment Bank
Financial Action Task Force (FATF)
Inter-American Development Bank
Inter-American Center of Tax Administrations (CIAT)
International Monetary Fund
International Finance Corporation
Intra-European Organisation of Tax Administrations (IOTA)
United Nations
World Bank Group
World Customs Organization

Compliance by country
The forum reviews compliance of its member tax jurisdictions separately for the two standards, the more limited exchange of information on request and the more comprehensive automated exchange of information.

More than 80 countries and territories were not (yet) members of the Global Forum as of November 2015 and are thus not included in the lists below. Notable non-members include Belarus and Serbia in Europe; Colombia and Venezuela in Latin America; Ethiopia, Algeria and many smaller countries in Africa; as well as Iran, Myanmar, North Korea and Vietnam in Asia. All important tax havens, however, are members of the Global Forum - the 30 countries topping the Financial Secrecy Index in 2013 were all members as of 2015.

Exchange of Information on Request
The Global Forum's peer review process examines both the legal and regulatory aspects of exchange (Phase 1 reviews) and the exchange of information in practice (Phase 2). The peer reviews cover only the limited exchange of information on request.

2013 Ratings
At its meeting in Jakarta in November 2013, the Global Forum assigned the ratings for the
first 50 jurisdictions that had completed their Phase 1 and Phase 2 reviews. The Phase 1 review found that 14 countries and territories had gaps in their legal framework and were not allowed to move to Phase 2 unless they improved their legal framework.

The ten countries and territories that were at the top of the Financial Secrecy Index 2013, an index established by the NGO Tax Justice Network and that also takes into account the size of the transactions in a tax haven, were categorized as follows: Lebanons and Switzerland had not completed Phase 1. Luxembourg was listed as Category D, Jersey as Category C, and the Cayman Islands, Germany, Hong Kong, Singapore as well as the United States were listed as Category B. Japan was the only country classified as one of the ten major tax havens by the Tax Justice Network that was listed in Category A.

The following jurisdictions are not eligible to move to Phase 2 review until they act on recommendations to improve their legal and regulatory framework:

Among those countries that had created an adequate legal framework and thus had moved to Phase 2, four countries - including Luxembourg - were found to be non-compliant with their own legal framework (grade D). Two countries - Austria and Turkey - were only partially compliant (grade C).

2015 Ratings
As of October 31, 2015 the ratings were as follows: 8 countries still had deficiencies in their legal framework. 25 countries, including Switzerland, had completed their legal framework (Phase 1 review), but had not yet had a Phase 2 review. Among the countries and territories that had passed a Phase 2 review, none was rated non-compliant (Grade D) any more. Nine countries were rated as only partially compliant (Grade C), still including Austria and Turkey.

The ten countries and territories that were at the top of the Financial Secrecy Index 2015, an index established by the NGO Tax Justice Network and that also takes into account the size of the transactions in a tax haven, were categorized as follows: Lebanon had not completed Phase 1. Switzerland and the UAE had completed Phase 1 and were awaiting Phase 2. Luxembourg and Jersey had moved up to Category B, along with the Cayman Islands, Germany, Hong Kong, Singapore as well as the United States. Bahrain, which had not been among the top ten tax havens in 2013, was also in Category B. Japan and Jersey had improved their transparency and were not any more among the ten most important tax havens, moving to number 12 and 16 respectively.

The following jurisdictions are not eligible to move to Phase 2 review until they act on recommendations to improve their legal and regulatory framework:

The following jurisdictions have completed the Phase 1 review, i.e. their legal framework had been reviewed and they were eligible to move to Phase 2:

The following countries and territories had passed a Phase 2 review:

2016 Ratings

The following jurisdictions have completed the Phase 1 review, i.e. their legal framework had been reviewed and they were eligible to move to Phase 2:

The following countries and territories had passed a Phase 2 review:

For the first time, a Combined review of both Phase 1 and Phase 2 was introduced as part of the review process :

2017 Ratings

Starting 2017, the Global Forum started its second round of Reviews, assessing new members for the first time as well as the progress made by the jurisdictions that underwent a review in the first Round. 
The following jurisdictions have completed a Combined review of both Phase 1 (legal and regulatory framework) and Phase 2 (implementation)

2018 Ratings

The following jurisdictions have completed a Combined review of both Phase 1 (legal and regulatory framework) and Phase 2 (implementation)

Automated Exchange of Information
As of March 2015, more than 90 countries have committed in principle to the automated exchange of tax information. 
More specifically, the first undertaking first exchanges by 2017 will be: Anguilla, Argentina, Barbados, Belgium, Bermuda, British Virgin Islands, Bulgaria, Cayman Islands,
Colombia, Croatia, Curaçao, Cyprus, Czech Republic, Denmark, Dominica, Estonia, Faroe Islands,
Finland, France, Germany, Gibraltar, Greece, Greenland, Guernsey, Hungary, Iceland, India, Ireland,
Isle of Man, Italy, Jersey, Korea, Latvia, Liechtenstein, Lithuania, Luxembourg, Malta, Mexico,
Montserrat, Netherlands, Niue, Norway, Poland, Portugal, Romania, San Marino, Seychelles, Slovak
Republic, Slovenia, South Africa, Spain, Sweden, Trinidad and Tobago, Turks and Caicos Islands,
United Kingdom
The ones undertaking first exchanges by 2018 will be: Albania, Andorra, Antigua and Barbuda, Aruba, Australia, Austria, The Bahamas, Belize, Brazil,
Brunei Darussalam, Canada, Chile, China, Cook Islands, Costa Rica, Ghana, Grenada, Hong Kong
(China), Indonesia, Israel, Japan, Kuwait, Marshall Islands, Macao (China), Malaysia, Mauritius,
Monaco, New Zealand, Qatar, Russia, Saint Kitts and Nevis, Samoa, Saint Lucia, Saint Vincent and
the Grenadines, Saudi Arabia, Singapore, Sint Maarten, Switzerland, Turkey, United Arab Emirates,
Uruguay

In the old situation, assessed at 2014, 50 countries had made a commitment (the list needs to be updated and completed):

As of November 2015, 41 countries have submitted specific commitments to implement legislation and other measures related to the automated exchange of tax information. No single tax haven has made specific commitments to the automated exchange of information so far. The following countries have passed primary legislation related to the automated exchange of tax information:

For the automated exchange of information to be implemented secondary legislation is also necessary. India, Japan, South Korea, Spain and the UK are the only countries that have also passed secondary legislation until October 2015. A peer review process on automated exchange of information, based on the existing peer review for information exchange on request, is in the process of being set up.

See also
 FATF blacklist
 List of offshore financial centres
 Financial Secrecy Index
 European Union withholding tax
 Corporate tax havens

References

External links
Official website
Exchange of Tax Information Portal

Offshore finance
Commercial crimes
Financial regulation
Tax evasion
International finance